Mask is a solo album by the Deep Purple bass guitarist Roger Glover. It was released on June 18, 1984, in Europe by 21 Records/Polydor. It was promoted with two music videos. It has been reissued on CD twice in the UK, in 1993 (Connoisseur Collection, b/w "Elements") and in 2005 (Cherry Red/Lemon). Neither has bonus material.

Track listing
All songs written by Roger Glover, except where noted.
One Side
 "Divided World" - 5:12
 "Getting Stranger" - 4:07
 "The Mask" (Roger Glover, Jean Roussel) - 7:32
 "Fake It" - 4:42

Another Side
 "Dancin' Again" (Roger Glover, Dave Gellis) - 3:30
 "(You're) So Remote" - 4:46
 "Hip Level" (Roger Glover, Chuck Burgi, Dave Gellis) - 7:19
 "Don't Look Down" - 3:41

Audio cassette bonus track
 "Unnatural" - originally as track no. 8 on side B

Personnel

Musicians
Roger Glover — lead vocals, bass (all tracks); percussion (tracks 3-5, 7), synthesizer (tracks 4, 6, 7), Ovation acoustic guitar (track 2), timbales (track 4), piano (track 5)
Craig Brooks — backing vocals (tracks 1, 3-5, 7, 8)
Kate McGarrigle — backing vocals (track 6)
Denise Brooks — backing vocals (track 8)
Kim Romano — backing vocals (track 8)
Charlie DeChant — saxophone (tracks 5-7)
Dave Gellis — guitar (all tracks)
Joe Jammer — guitar (tracks 2, 3, 8)
David Rosenthal — keyboards (track 1-3, 6, 8)
Jean Roussel — synthesizer (tracks 2, 3, 8)
Chuck Burgi — drums (all tracks)
Mark Conese — electronic drums (track 3)
Nick Blagona — percussion, dub (track 6)

Production notes
Engineered by Nick Blagona
Additional engineering by Jeffrey Kawalek and Mike Barry
Mixed by Roger Glover and Nick Blagona
Mastered at Sterling Sound by Greg Calbi

Singles
 "The Mask" / "The Mask" (edit)
 "The Mask" (12" Remix) / "Fake It"
 "The Mask" / "You're So Remote"
 "Divided World" / "Dancin' Again"

References

External links
 Roger-Glover.com

1984 albums
Albums produced by Roger Glover
PolyGram albums
Roger Glover albums